Peter Swan may refer to:

Peter Swan (footballer, born 1936), (1936–2021) Sheffield Wednesday and England player who was involved in the 1964 British betting scandal
Peter Swan (footballer, born 1966), (1966) former Leeds United, Hull City, Port Vale, Plymouth Argyle, Burnley, Bury and York City player

See also
Peter Swann (born 1965), British businessman